Macrocleptes is a genus of longhorn beetles of the subfamily Lamiinae, containing the following species:

 Macrocleptes caledonicus Breuning, 1947
 Macrocleptes tuberculipennis Breuning, 1978

References

Parmenini